J. C. Hutchins is the pseudonym for American podcast novelist and journalist Chris Hutchins. Hutchins is best known for his 7th Son series.

Background
Hutchins began podcasting in 2006 after receiving multiple rejections from various agents, with 7th Son being his first podcast release. Shortly thereafter in 2007, St. Martin's Press picked up the print rights to 7th Son and Dark Arts, an interactive novel. Hutchins, dubbed a "new media superstar," writes from home alongside his partner, novelist Eleanor Brown.

Bibliography

Books published in print
7th Son: Descent (2009)
Personal Effects: Dark Arts (2009)

Podcast novels
7th Son: Descent
7th Son: Deceit
7th Son: Destruction
Personal Effects: Sword of Blood

Reception
Critical reception to Hutchins' work has been mixed to positive, with Publishers Weekly praising both the first novel in the 7th Son series and Dark Arts and Kirkus Reviews panning both. The Celebrity Cafe reviewed Dark Arts, praising the story but stating that the extra elements detracted from the story instead of enhancing it.

References

External links
Official author site

American male writers
Living people
1975 births